Hans Nordin (born 13 July 1959) is a Swedish curler and curling coach.

In 1990 he was inducted into the Swedish Curling Hall of Fame.

Teams

References

External links

Living people
1959 births
Swedish male curlers
European curling champions
Swedish curling champions
Swedish curling coaches
20th-century Swedish people